George Ballantyne (born 27 May 1952) is an English former professional rugby league footballer who played in the 1960s, 1970s and 1980s.

Background
George Ballantyne was born in Leeds, West Riding of Yorkshire, England.

Playing career

Wakefield Trinity
Ballantyne made his début for Wakefield Trinity on 27 January 1969, playing  in the 14–23 defeat by Hull Kingston Rovers at Belle Vue, Wakefield. He is the youngest forward to make his début for Wakefield Trinity, aged 16 years and eight months old.

Ballantyne played as a substitute, (replacing  David Knowles) in Wakefield Trinity's 2-7 defeat by Leeds in the 1973 Yorkshire Cup Final during the 1973–74 season at Headingley, Leeds on Saturday 20 October 1973, and played  in the 13–16 defeat by Hull Kingston Rovers in the 1974 Yorkshire Cup Final during the 1974–75 season at Headingley, Leeds on Saturday 26 October 1974.

Castleford
Ballantyne was transferred from Wakefield Trinity to Castleford in 1978 for a then Castleford club record fee of £11,000.

County honours
George Ballantyne won caps for Yorkshire while at Wakefield Trinity against Cumberland at Bramley's stadium 1973, and  while at Castleford he played  in the 7–23 defeat by Lancashire at Widnes' stadium on 27 September 1978.

Personal life

References

External links
George Ballantyne Memory Box Search at archive.castigersheritage.com

1952 births
Living people
Bramley RLFC players
Castleford Tigers players
English rugby league players
Featherstone Rovers players
Hunslet R.L.F.C. players
Keighley Cougars players
Rugby league players from Leeds
Rugby league props
Wakefield Trinity players
York Wasps players
Yorkshire rugby league team players